Elota is a municipality in the Mexican state of Sinaloa. It stands at 
.

The municipality reported 55,339 inhabitants in the 2020 census.

The municipal seat of Elota is the city of La Cruz.

References

External links
http://www.elota.gob.mx/

Populated places in Sinaloa